The lined conger (Bathycongrus guttulatus) is an eel in the family Congridae (conger/garden eels). It was described by Albert Günther in 1887, originally under the genus Congromuraena. It is a marine, deep water-dwelling eel which is known from the western Indian Ocean to the southwestern Pacific Ocean, including Indonesia and Hawaii. It dwells at a depth range of 270–1270 metres.

References

Bathycongrus
Fish described in 1887
Taxa named by Albert Günther